Nils Koppang (born 21 April 1958) is a Norwegian fencer. He competed in the individual and team épée events at the 1976 and 1984 Summer Olympics.

References

External links
 

1958 births
Living people
Norwegian male épée fencers
Olympic fencers of Norway
Fencers at the 1976 Summer Olympics
Fencers at the 1984 Summer Olympics
Sportspeople from Oslo
20th-century Norwegian people